Ulmar (formerly, Ulmar Siding) is a former unincorporated community now annexed to Livermore in Alameda County, California. It lies at an elevation of 551 feet (168 m).

References

Neighborhoods in Livermore, California
Unincorporated communities in Alameda County, California